Sude Yılmaz (born 15 March 2002) is a Turkish basketball player for Galatasaray and the Turkish national team.

References

External links
 Sude Yılmaz at Galatasaray.org

2002 births
Living people
Small forwards
Turkish women's basketball players
Galatasaray S.K. (women's basketball) players
Basketball players from Istanbul